Anders Andersen may refer to:
Anders Andersen (Norway) (1846–1931), Norwegian politician, founder of the Norwegian Labour Party
Anders Andersen (Denmark), Danish politician, finance minister, 1973–1975
Anders Andersen (wrestler) (1881–1961), Danish Greco-Roman wrestler in the 1908 Summer Olympics
Anders Andersen (speedway rider) (born 1988), Danish motorcycle speedway rider
 Anders Hartington Andersen Danish marathon runner, 1932-6 Olympics

See also
Anders Andersson (disambiguation)